An association fallacy is an informal inductive fallacy of the hasty-generalization or red-herring type and which asserts, by irrelevant association and often by appeal to emotion, that qualities of one thing are inherently qualities of another. Two types of association fallacies are sometimes referred to as guilt by association and honor by association.

Form 

In notation of first-order logic, this type of fallacy can be expressed as (∃x ∈ S : φ(x)) ⇒ (∀x ∈ S : φ(x)), meaning "if there exists any x in the set S so that a property φ is true for x, then for all x in S the property φ must be true."

Premise: A is a B
Premise: A is also a C
Conclusion: Therefore, all Bs are Cs

The fallacy in the argument can be illustrated through the use of an Euler diagram: "A" satisfies the requirement that it is part of both sets "B" and "C", but if one represents this as an Euler diagram, it can clearly be seen that it is possible that a part of set "B" is not part of set "C", refuting the conclusion that "all Bs are Cs".

Guilt by association

Examples 
Some syllogistic examples of guilt by association:

 John is a con artist. John has black hair. Therefore, all people with black hair are con artists.
 Lyle is a crooked salesman. Lyle proposes a monorail. Therefore, the proposed monorail is folly.
 Country X is a dangerous country. Country X has a national postal service. Therefore, countries with national postal services are dangerous.
 Simon and Karl live in Nashville, and they are both petty criminals. Jill lives in Nashville; therefore, Jill is a petty criminal.

Guilt by association as an ad hominem fallacy 
Guilt by association can sometimes also be a type of ad hominem fallacy, if the argument attacks a person because of the similarity between the views of someone making an argument and other proponents of the argument.

This form of the argument is as follows:

 Group A makes a particular claim.
 Group B, which is currently viewed negatively by some, makes the same claim as Group A.
 Therefore, Group A is viewed as associated with Group B, and is now also viewed negatively.

An example of this fallacy would be "My opponent for office just received an endorsement from the Puppy Haters Association. Is that the sort of person you would want to vote for?"

Honor by association

The counterpart of "guilt by association" is honor by association, where one claims that someone or something must be reputable because of the people or organizations that are related to it or otherwise support it.

Examples:

 Citizens of Country X won more Nobel Prizes, gold medals, and literary awards than citizens of Country Y. Therefore, a citizen of Country X is superior to a citizen of Country Y.
 Gary has a voice type and pronunciation which gives a trustworthy impression. Gary is a car salesman and says to customers that his cars are in good condition. Therefore, the cars are in good condition.
 In many advertisements, businesses heavily use the principle of honor by association. For example, an attractive spokesperson will say that a specific product is good. The attractiveness of the spokesperson gives the product good associations.

Galileo gambit 
A form of the association fallacy often used by those denying a well-established scientific or historical proposition is the so-called Galileo gambit. The argument runs thus: Galileo was ridiculed in his time for his scientific observations, but was later acknowledged to be right; the proponent argues that since their non-mainstream views are provoking ridicule and rejection from other scientists, they will later be recognized as correct, like Galileo. The gambit is flawed in that being ridiculed does not necessarily correlate with being right and that many people who have been ridiculed in history were, in fact, wrong. Similarly, Carl Sagan has stated that people laughed at geniuses such as Christopher Columbus and the Wright brothers, but "they also laughed at Bozo the Clown".

See also

Citations

General and cited references 

 Fallacies: Classical and Contemporary Readings, edited by Hans V. Hansen and Robert C. Pinto (1995).
 Bibliography on Fallacies

External links 
 The Fallacy Files at Guilt by Association
 "Transfer technique" at Propagandacritic.com
 "Testimonial" at Propagandacritic.com

Genetic fallacies
Syllogistic fallacies